Triloculinella is a genus of Miliolacean forams with a fusiform to asymmetrically globular test. Inner chambers, one-half coil in length, are crypto-quinqueloculine to quinqueloculine in arrangement; The final three to five  visible from the exterior. The aperture is an arch at the end of the final chamber, largely covered by a broad apertural flap, which distinguishes the genus from Triloculina, Quinqueloculina and such, characterized by a more narrow tooth.  The  wall, as for all miliolids, is calcareous, imperforate, porcelaneous.

The World Foraminifera Datavase   has Quinquinella Vella, 1977, and Scutuloris Loeblich & Tappan, 1953 as synonyms of Triloculinella.   Shows nine recognized species with two more accepted as Miliolinella and one other as Quinqueloculina.
Defines Foraminifera as a phylum, rather than a class is in Sen Gupta 1999, within the Infrakingdom Rhizaria.

Imiges and illustrations of Triloculinella can be found at Triloculinella Foraminifera and Triloculinella in the World Foramiinifera Database.

References

 Alfred R. Loeblich Jr and Helen Tappan, 1964. Sarcodina Chiefly "Thecamoebians" and Foraminiferida; Treatise on Invertebrate Paleontology, Part C Protista 2. Geological Society of America and University of Kansas Press. 
 Alfred R. Loeblich Jr and Helen Tappan,1988. Forminiferal Genera and their Classification. 
 Barun K. Sen Gupta 1999. Modern Foraminifera.

Tubothalamea
Foraminifera genera
Extant Oligocene first appearances